The Department of Education and Science was an Australian government department that existed between December 1966 and December 1972.

Scope
Information about the department's functions and/or government funding allocation could be found in the Administrative Arrangements Orders, the annual Portfolio Budget Statements and in the Department's annual reports.

At its creation, the Department's functions were:
general education policy
education research
administration of various schemes of assistance for overseas students in Australia, particularly the Colombo Plan
Australian activities in relation to UNESCO
administration of scholarships for Australian students
administrative assistance for the committee concerned with the development of the concept and scheme of advanced education in Australia
science facilities grants to secondary schools both government and non-government
secretariat for the Australian Research Grants Committee

Structure
The Department was a Commonwealth Public Service department, staffed by officials who were responsible to the Minister for Education and Science.

References

Ministries established in 1966
Education and Science